North Webster High School is a co-educational secondary school on Church Street, in Springhill, Louisiana, United States. The catchment area consists of the neighboring areas: Cullen and Western Shongaloo.

School history
In 2011, the parish school board faced a large financial deficit and considered a series of options.  Ultimately a plan for consolidation was adopted, in which schools in Sarepta, Cotton Valley, Shongaloo were consolidated into Springhill High School, and the high school was renamed North Webster High School.  The new mascot for the school became the "Knights," instead of the Lumberjacks.

Athletics
North Webster High athletics competes in the LHSAA.

Championships
 Springhill Football championships
(2) State Championships: 1952, 1985

Notable alumni
Drayton Boucher (attended middle 1920s), former member of the Louisiana State Senate
Savannah Smith Boucher (Class of 1961), actress
Sherry Boucher (Class of 1963), former actress
John David Crow (Class of 1953), American football player and coach and 1957 Heisman Trophy winner at Texas A&M
Jack Montgomery (Class of 1954), state senator from 1968 to 1972
Charcandrick West (Class of 2010), American football player for the Kansas City Chiefs
 Devin White (Class of 2016), All-American linebacker at LSU, and Super Bowl LV champion for the Tampa Bay Buccaneers

Footnotes

External links
North Webster High School official website

Public high schools in Louisiana
Schools in Webster Parish, Louisiana